Bristly buttercup is a common name for several plants and may refer to:

Ranunculus hispidus
Ranunculus pensylvanicus, native to North America